John Arec Gianelli (born June 10, 1950) is an American former professional basketball player. At a height of 6'10" (2.08 m ) tall, he played at the power forward and center positions. He played eight seasons (1972–1980) in the National Basketball Association (NBA) with the New York Knicks, Buffalo Braves, Milwaukee Bucks, and Utah Jazz.

College career
Gianelli graduated from Edison High School in 1968. He matriculated at the University of the Pacific where he was a three-year letterman with the Tigers men's basketball team in 1970, 1971 and 1972. He averaged 21.5 points and 17.2 rebounds in his senior year, the latter ranked second in the nation. His uniform number 23 was retired in May 1973, the second in Pacific's men's basketball history. He was inducted into the university's Athletics Hall of Fame in 1986.

Professional career
Gianelli was selected by the Houston Rockets twentieth overall in the second round of the 1972 NBA draft. After not agreeing to contract terms with the Rockets, his NBA negotiation rights were obtained by the Knicks on September 19, 1972.

He was involved in four other transactions during his NBA career, the first two within a year of each other. He was traded along with $3.3 million from the Knicks to the Braves for Bob McAdoo and Tom McMillen on December 9, 1976. Gianelli was sent from the Braves to the Bucks for a first-round pick in the 1979 NBA draft (eventually dealt to the Detroit Pistons) and cash nine months later on September 2, 1977.

The final two transactions happened within five months of each other. He was traded along with the eighth overall selection in the first round of the 1979 NBA draft (Calvin Natt) from the Bucks to the New Jersey Nets for Harvey Catchings on May 31, 1979. He never appeared in a game with the Nets, as he was dealt along with Bernard King and Jim Boylan to the Jazz for Rich Kelley and cash on October 2.

He averaged 7.8 points and 5.9 rebounds per game in his NBA career, and won a league championship with New York in 1973. He also played professionally in Italy for three years, with Olimpia Milano. He was the starting center and one of two foreign players on the Olimpia Milano team that captured the 1981–82 Lega Basket Serie A championship; the other foreigner was starting point guard Mike D'Antoni.

NBA career statistics

Regular season

|-
| style="text-align:left;background:#afe6ba;"| 1972–73†
| align="left" | New York
| 52 || - || 9.9 || .451 || - || .697 || 2.9 || 0.5 || - || - || 3.5
|-
| align="left" | 1973–74
| align="left" | New York
| 70 || - || 20.3 || .479 || - || .760 || 4.9 || 1.1 || 0.3 || 0.6 || 7.3
|-
| align="left" | 1974–75
| align="left" | New York
| 80 || - || 35.0 || .472 || - || .692 || 8.6 || 2.0 || 0.5 || 1.5 || 10.3
|-
| align="left" | 1975–76
| align="left" | New York
| 82 || - || 28.4 || .473 || - || .713 || 6.7 || 1.4 || 0.3 || 0.8 || 9.3
|-
| align="left" | 1976–77
| align="left" | New York
| 19 || - || 33.2 || .473 || - || .729 || 9.4 || 1.4 || 0.7 || 1.5 || 10.9
|-
| align="left" | 1976–77
| align="left" | Buffalo
| 57 || - || 22.5 || .431 || - || .714 || 5.2 || 1.0 || 0.4 || 1.2 || 7.0
|-
| align="left" | 1977–78
| align="left" | Milwaukee
| 82 || - || 28.4 || .488 || - || .642 || 6.2 || 2.3 || 0.7 || 1.1 || 8.5
|-
| align="left" | 1978–79
| align="left" | Milwaukee
| style="background:#cfecec;"| 82* || - || 25.1 || .486 || - || .706 || 5.0 || 2.0 || 0.5 || 0.7 || 7.1
|-
| align="left" | 1979–80
| align="left" | Utah
| 17 || - || 16.8 || .348 || .000 || .563 || 3.6 || 1.0 || 0.4 || 0.4 || 3.2
|- class="sortbottom"
| style="text-align:center;" colspan="2"| Career
| 541 || - || 25.2 || .470 || .000 || .702 || 5.9 || 1.5 || 0.5 || 1.0 || 7.8
|}

Playoffs

|-
| style="text-align:left;background:#afe6ba;"| 1972–73†
| align="left" | New York
| 7 || - || 7.9 || .550 || - || .429 || 1.9 || 0.1 || - || - || 3.6
|-
| align="left" | 1973–74
| align="left" | New York
| 12 || - || 28.2 || .407 || - || .720 || 7.3 || 1.9 || 0.3 || 0.5 || 7.3
|-
| align="left" | 1974–75
| align="left" | New York
| 3 || - || 31.0 || .458 || - || 1.000 || 4.7 || 0.7 || 0.0 || 1.3 || 8.3
|-
| align="left" | 1977–78
| align="left" | Milwaukee
| 9 || - || 32.2 || .424 || - || .769 || 6.4 || 1.6 || 0.9 || 1.2 || 7.8
|- class="sortbottom"
| style="text-align:center;" colspan="2"| Career
| 31 || - || 25.0 || .434 || - || .721 || 5.6 || 1.3 || 0.5 || 0.9 || 6.7
|}

References

External links

1950 births
Living people
American expatriate basketball people in Italy
American men's basketball players
Basketball players from Stockton, California
Buffalo Braves players
Centers (basketball)
Houston Rockets draft picks
Milwaukee Bucks players
New York Knicks players
Olimpia Milano players
Pacific Tigers men's basketball players
Power forwards (basketball)
Utah Jazz players